Brighton Early Music Festival is an annual English music festival which includes concerts, workshops and other educational events in Brighton and Hove. The festival explores the connections between classical music, folk music and world music from the Middle Ages until the early 19th century. The organisation supports and promotes musicians who specialise in historically informed performance, performing on period instruments and exploring the sound world that composers of the past would have had in mind when writing their music.

The festival was established in 2002 with a small pilot series.  It has been programmed and managed by Co-Artistic Directors and sopranos, Deborah Roberts and Clare Norburn, with Norburn stepping down in 2017. In 2003, the festival became formally constituted and set up as a registered charity.  The festival is supported by a dedicated committee of volunteers who are responsible for all areas of managing the festival.

Brighton Early Music Festival takes place each autumn from October to November in venues across Brighton and Hove, including St Bartholomew's Church, Brighton, The Royal Pavilion, St George's Church, Brighton, The Old Market and the Brighton Dome complex.  Each year, BBC Radio 3 broadcasts a number of concerts from the festival.

Performers
Artists who have appeared in the festival include:

 Emma Kirkby (soprano)
 The London Handel Players
 His Majestys Sagbutts & Cornetts
 The Orlando Consort
 Alison Bury (violin)
 Ex Cathedra
 I Fagiolini
 Orchestra of the Age of Enlightenment
 The Sixteen
 Red Priest
 The Tallis Scholars
 Florilegium
 Joglaresa
 Palisander
 Le Baroque Nomade
 Vox Animae
 The Brook Street Band
 The Harp Consort

References

External links
Brighton Early Music Festival

Classical music festivals in England
Early music festivals
Music in Brighton and Hove
Festivals in Brighton and Hove
Music festivals in East Sussex
2002 establishments in England
Music festivals established in 2002